Big Lonely Doug is a large Coast Douglas-fir (Pseudotsuga menziesii) tree located in the Gordon River Valley of Vancouver Island in British Columbia, Canada. It is the second largest Douglas-fir tree in Canada after the Red Creek Fir in nearby San Juan Valley.

History
The tree was seeded sometime around 1000 CE.

In 2011, logger Dennis Cronin discovered the enormous tree while surveying a patch of forest that was to be logged for timber. He wrapped green ribbon around the tree with the words "Leave Tree" repeated along the ribbon, saving it from being felled. In 2014, photographer and activist T.J. Watt happened upon the tree and named it "Big Lonely Doug", a play on the tree's species name and its relative isolation amid the clearcut. The tree has since become a symbol of nature conservation in Canada, and was featured in the 2018 book Big Lonely Doug: The Story of One of Canada's Last Great Trees by journalist Harley Rustad.

Dimensions
These measurements were made by forest ecologist Andy MacKinnon on behalf of the Ancient Forest Alliance and University of British Columbia on 18 April 2014. The results were published the following week on 24 April 2014.

See also
 Boole - a giant sequoia whose immediate surroundings were also clearcut
 List of individual trees

References

External links
Drone footage of Big Lonely Doug, August 2016

Individual Douglas firs
Individual trees in British Columbia
Juan de Fuca region